Conditional random fields (CRFs) are a class of statistical modeling methods often applied in pattern recognition and machine learning and used for structured prediction. Whereas a classifier predicts a label for a single sample without considering "neighbouring" samples, a CRF can take context into account. To do so, the predictions are modelled as a graphical model, which represents the presence of dependencies between the predictions. What kind of graph is used depends on the application. For example, in natural language processing, "linear chain" CRFs are popular, for which each prediction is dependent only on its immediate neighbours. In image processing, the graph typically connects locations to nearby and/or similar locations to enforce that they receive similar predictions.

Other examples where CRFs are used are: labeling or parsing of sequential data for natural language processing or biological sequences, part-of-speech tagging, shallow parsing, named entity recognition, gene finding, peptide critical functional region finding, and object recognition and image segmentation in computer vision.

Description
CRFs are a type of discriminative undirected probabilistic graphical model.

Lafferty, McCallum and Pereira define a CRF on observations  and random variables  as follows:

, where  means

Inference
For general graphs, the problem of exact inference in CRFs is intractable. The inference problem for a CRF is basically the same as for an MRF and the same arguments hold.
However, there exist special cases for which exact inference is feasible:

 If the graph is a chain or a tree, message passing algorithms yield exact solutions. The algorithms used in these cases are analogous to the forward-backward and Viterbi algorithm for the case of HMMs.
 If the CRF only contains pair-wise potentials and the energy is submodular, combinatorial min cut/max flow algorithms yield exact solutions.

If exact inference is impossible, several algorithms can be used to obtain approximate solutions. These include:
 Loopy belief propagation
 Alpha expansion
 Mean field inference
 Linear programming relaxations

Parameter Learning
If all nodes have exponential family distributions and all nodes are observed during training, this optimization is convex. It can be solved for example using gradient descent algorithms, or Quasi-Newton methods such as the L-BFGS algorithm. On the other hand, if some variables are unobserved, the inference problem has to be solved for these variables. Exact inference is intractable in general graphs, so approximations have to be used.

Examples
In sequence modeling, the graph of interest is usually a chain graph. An input sequence of observed variables  represents a sequence of observations and  represents a hidden (or unknown) state variable that needs to be inferred given the observations.
 decoding, determining the probability of a given label sequence  given .
 inference, determining the most likely label sequence  given .

Linear-chain CRFs have many of the same applications as conceptually simpler hidden Markov models (HMMs), but relax certain assumptions about the input and output sequence distributions. An HMM can loosely be understood as a CRF with very specific feature functions that use constant probabilities to model state transitions and emissions. Conversely, a CRF can loosely be understood as a generalization of an HMM that makes the constant transition probabilities into arbitrary functions that vary across the positions in the sequence of hidden states, depending on the input sequence.

Notably, in contrast to HMMs, CRFs can contain any number of feature functions, the feature functions can inspect the entire input sequence  at any point during inference, and the range of the feature functions need not have a probabilistic interpretation.

Variants

Higher-order CRFs and semi-Markov CRFs

CRFs can be extended into higher order models by making each  dependent on a fixed number  of previous variables .

However, another recent advance has managed to ameliorate these issues by leveraging concepts and tools from the field of Bayesian nonparametrics. Specifically, the CRF-infinity approach constitutes a CRF-type model that is capable of learning infinitely-long temporal dynamics in a scalable fashion. This is effected by introducing a novel potential function for CRFs that is based on the Sequence Memoizer (SM), a nonparametric Bayesian model for learning infinitely-long dynamics in sequential observations. To render such a model computationally tractable, CRF-infinity employs a mean-field approximation of the postulated novel potential functions (which are driven by an SM). This allows for devising efficient approximate training and inference algorithms for the model, without undermining its capability to capture and model temporal dependencies of arbitrary length.

There exists another generalization of CRFs, the semi-Markov conditional random field (semi-CRF), which models variable-length segmentations of the label sequence .

Finally, large-margin models for structured prediction, such as the structured Support Vector Machine can be seen as an alternative training procedure to CRFs.

Latent-dynamic conditional random field
Latent-dynamic conditional random fields (LDCRF) or discriminative probabilistic latent variable models (DPLVM) are a type of CRFs for sequence tagging tasks. They are latent variable models that are trained discriminatively.

In an LDCRF, like in any sequence tagging task, given a sequence of observations x = , the main problem the model must solve is how to assign a sequence of labels y =  from one finite set of labels . Instead of directly modeling (y|x) as an ordinary linear-chain CRF would do, a set of latent variables h is "inserted" between x and y using the chain rule of probability:

This allows capturing latent structure between the observations and labels. While LDCRFs can be trained using quasi-Newton methods, a specialized version of the perceptron algorithm called the latent-variable perceptron has been developed for them as well, based on Collins' structured perceptron algorithm. These models find applications in computer vision, specifically gesture recognition from video streams and shallow parsing.

See also 
 Hammersley–Clifford theorem
 Maximum entropy Markov model (MEMM)

References

Further reading
 McCallum, A.: Efficiently inducing features of conditional random fields. In: Proc. 19th Conference on Uncertainty in Artificial Intelligence. (2003)
 Wallach, H.M.: Conditional random fields: An introduction. Technical report MS-CIS-04-21, University of Pennsylvania (2004)
 Sutton, C., McCallum, A.: An Introduction to Conditional Random Fields for Relational Learning. In "Introduction to Statistical Relational Learning". Edited by Lise Getoor and Ben Taskar. MIT Press. (2006) Online PDF
 Klinger, R., Tomanek, K.: Classical Probabilistic Models and Conditional Random Fields. Algorithm Engineering Report TR07-2-013, Department of Computer Science, Dortmund University of Technology, December 2007. ISSN 1864-4503. Online PDF

Graphical models
Machine learning